The 1977 Los Angeles Rams season was the team's 40th year with the National Football League and the 32nd season in Los Angeles.

Hobbled by chronic knee woes, quarterback Joe Namath was waived by the New York Jets after the 1976 season, after they were unable to trade him. Namath signed with the Rams in May 1977. Hope of a Rams revival sprung when Los Angeles won two of their first three games, but Namath was hampered by low mobility. After a poor performance in a Monday Night loss to the Bears, Namath never saw NFL game action again.

After a home playoff loss to the Minnesota Vikings 14–7 on a saturated field in game which has been termed the "Mud Bowl", Rams head coach Chuck Knox was fired due to ownership's frustration that Knox had not been able to reach the Super Bowl.

Offseason

NFL Draft

Roster

Regular season

Schedule

Game summaries

Week 1
Namath threw a 27-yard touchdown pass to Harold Jackson early, but then it was all Falcons as their defense totally shut down the running game. Scott Hunter, starting in place of injured Steve Bartkowski, directed a ball-control attack and ran for a touchdown.

Week 2
TV Network: CBS
Announcers: Don Criqui, Emerson Boozer
Attendance: 46,031
Namath passed for two touchdowns in this game, 14 yards to Lawrence McCutcheon and 2 yards to Terry Nelson. Rafael Septién provided the other scoring with 2 extra points and 2 field goals (20 and 23). It also turned out to be the final two touchdowns Namath would ever throw in his Hall of Fame career.

Week 3
McCutcheon and John Cappelletti both ran for two touchdowns in this blowout.  Jim Plunkett was completely ineffective against the Rams defense.

Week 4 
Namath's final NFL start and game. He was 16 for 40 and once again victimized by no running game.  Rams did get off to a 13–0 lead, but Bears QB Bob Avellini completed two long touchdown passes to James Scott and Walter Payton ran for 126 yards to bring the Bears back.

Week 5 
TV Network: CBS
Announcers: Tim Ryan, Sonny Jurgensen
Attendance: 46,045
Pat Haden took back over as the starting quarterback and led a ball-control attack with McCutcheon gaining 152 yards and rookie Wendell Tyler scoring his first career NFL touchdown on a 16-yard run.

Week 6 
In a Monday Night blowout, Haden passed for two touchdowns and ran for another.  The Rams' defense sacked Fran Tarkenton four times and intercepted him twice, both by rookie Pat Thomas.

Week 7 
In a wild game at the New Orleans Superdome, the Saints won on a 31-yard field goal by Rich Szaro with 16 seconds left.
TV Network: CBS
Announcers: Vin Scully and Alex Hawkins

Week 8 
TV Network: CBS
Announcers: Bob Costas and Sonny Jurgensen
Haden continued to roll with two more touchdown passes and Jim Youngblood scored on a 25-yard interception return and handed the Buccaneers their 22nd straight loss.

Week 9 
McCutcheon and Tyler each scored running touchdowns and Haden passed for another.

Week 10 
Rookie wide receiver Billy Waddy scored his first NFL touchdown on a pass from Haden and McCutcheon scored on a 42-yard run.

Week 11 
Rams won slug-it-out game in the mud despite Haden throwing 3 INT's.  Cappelletti scored on a 7-yard run and Rafael Septién added a field goal.

Week 12
Against the defending Super Bowl champions, the Rams survived a late scoring drive and a touchdown pass by Ken Stabler by answering with a 43-yard Haden-to-Harold Jackson touchdown bomb with around two minutes left.  The win clinched the Rams' fifth straight division title.

Week 13 
TV Network: CBS
Rams avenged their season-opening loss to the Falcons as Haden ran for a touchdown and passed for another to Cappelletti.

Week 14 
In the cold and rain at RFK Stadium, Redskins quarterback Billy Kilmer threw for two early touchdowns.  Rookie backup quarterback Vince Ferragamo nearly led the Rams back in the second half with two touchdowns of his own, but Septién missed a potential game-tying FG with no time left. It turned out to be George Allen's final regular-season game as an NFL coach.

Playoffs

Standings

References

Los Angeles Rams
Los Angeles Rams seasons
NFC West championship seasons
Los Angeles Rams